is a dam in the Gunma Prefecture of Japan.

Shinaki dam was constructed to neutralize strong acid water that flowed from Kusatsu Onsen. Calcium carbonate is used for neutralizing.

Dams in Gunma Prefecture
Dams completed in 1965